Misao is a unisex Japanese given name.

Misao may also refer to:

 Misao (food), Malagasy fried noodles
 Misao, a Kuki tribe of Assam

People with the surname
, Japanese footballer
, Japanese footballer

Japanese-language surnames